The 2010 congressional elections in Montana was held on November 2, 2010, and determined who would represent the state of Montana in the United States House of Representatives. Montana has one seat in the House, apportioned according to the 2000 United States Census. Representatives are elected for two-year terms; the elected will serve in the 112th Congress from January 3, 2011 until January 3, 2013.

Democratic primary

Candidates
Dennis McDonald, former Chairman of the Montana Democratic Party
Tyler Gernant, attorney
Melinda Gopher, Native American activist
Sam Rankin

Results

Republican primary

Candidates
Denny Rehberg, incumbent U.S. Congressman
Mark T. French, Clark Fork Valley Hospital scientist
A. J. Otjen, Montana State University Billings professor

Results

General election

Results

County results

Source

{| class="wikitable sortable" style="text-align:center"
|-
!|
! style="text-align:center;" colspan="2"| Denny RehbergRepublican
! style="text-align:center;" colspan="2"| Dennis McDonaldDemocratic
! style="text-align:center;" colspan="2"| Mike FellowsLibertarian
! style="text-align:center;" colspan="2"| Margin
! style="text-align:center;"| Total
|-
! align=center | County
! style="text-align:center;" data-sort-type="number"| Votes
! style="text-align:center;" data-sort-type="number"| %
! style="text-align:center;" data-sort-type="number"| Votes
! style="text-align:center;" data-sort-type="number"| %
! style="text-align:center;" data-sort-type="number"| Votes
! style="text-align:center;" data-sort-type="number"| %
! style="text-align:center;" data-sort-type="number"| Votes
! style="text-align:center;" data-sort-type="number"| %
! style="text-align:center;" data-sort-type="number"| Votes
|-
| align=center|Beaverhead||2,716||72.82%||840||22.52%||174||4.66%||984||26.38%||3,730
|-
| align=center|Big Horn||1,600||40.73%||2,152||54.79%||176||4.48%||552||14.05%||3,928
|-
| align=center|Blaine||1,165||63.77%||613||33.55%||49||2.68%||552||30.21%||1,827
|-
| align=center|Broadwater||1,895||73.25%||551||21.30%||141||5.45%||1,344||51.95%||2,587
|-
| align=center|Carbon||2,837||58.87%||1,667||34.59%||315||6.54%||1,170||24.28%||4,819
|-
| align=center|Carter||613||89.49%||54||7.88%||18||2.63%||559||81.61%||685
|-
| align=center|Cascade||16,241||62.05%||8,867||33.88%||1,064||4.07%||7,374||28.18%||26,172
|-
| align=center|Chouteau||1,703||73.98%||509||22.11%||90||3.91%||1,194||51.87%||2,302
|-
| align=center|Custer||2,699||66.54%||1,163||28.67%||194||4.78%||1,536||37.87%||4,056
|-
| align=center|Daniels||629||70.99%||202||22.80%||55||6.21%||427||48.19%||886
|-
| align=center|Dawson||2,459||67.83%||1,007||27.78%||159||4.39%||1,452||40.06%||3,625|-
| align=center|Deer Lodge||1,347||40.13%||1,828||54.45%||182||5.42%||481||14.33%||3,357|-
| align=center|Fallon||864||78.76%||202||18.41%||31||2.83%||662||60.35%||1,097|-
| align=center|Fergus||3,795||73.50%||1,130||21.89%||238||4.61%||2,665||51.62%||5,163|-
| align=center|Flathead||21,153||67.68%||8,127||26.00%||1,975||6.32%||13,026||41.68||31,255|-
| align=center|Gallatin||18,221||58.56%||11,125||35.75%||1,769||5.69%||7,096||22.81%||31,115|-
| align=center|Garfield||569||84.05%||75||11.08%||33||4.87%||494||72.97%||677|-
| align=center|Glacier||1,316||49.46%||1,246||46.82%||99||3.72%||70||2.63%||2,661|-
| align=center|Golden Valley||278||68.64%||108||26.67%||19||4.69%||170||41.98%||405|-
| align=center|Granite||985||68.45%||348||24.18%||106||7.37%||637||44.27%||1,439|-
| align=center|Hill||3,142||60.70%||1,787||34.52%||247||4.77%||1,355||26.18%||5,176|-
| align=center|Jefferson||3,430||65.25%||1,529||29.09%||298||5.67%||1,901||36.16%||5,257|-
| align=center|Judith Basin||794||75.05%||229||21.64%||35||3.31%||565||53.40%||1,058|-
| align=center|Lake||6,014||58.66%||3,517||34.31%||721||7.03%||2,497||24.36%||10,252|-
| align=center|Lewis and Clark||14,221||56.54%||9,684||38.50%||1,246||4.95%||4,537||18.04%||25,151|-
| align=center|Liberty||706||76.81%||178||19.28%||39||4.22%||528||57.20%||923|-
| align=center|Lincoln||4,926||69.16%||1,688||23.70%||509||7.15%||3,238||45.46%||7,123|-
| align=center|Madison||2,541||70.04%||847||23.35%||240||6.62%||1,694||46.69%||3,628|-
| align=center|McCone||631||71.62%||220||24.97%||30||3.41%||411||46.65%||881|-
| align=center|Meagher||610||74.66%||152||18.60%||55||6.73%||458||56.06%||817|-
| align=center|Mineral||1,135||62.67%||530||29.27%||146||8.06%||605||33.41%||1,811|-
| align=center|Missoula||17,789||47.14%||17,637||46.73%||2,314||6.13%||152||0.40%||37,740|-
| align=center|Musselshell||1,356||72.40%||385||20.56%||132||7.05%||971||51.84%||1,873|-
| align=center|Park||4,148||60.28%||2,355||34.22%||378||5.49%||1,793||26.06%||6,881|-
| align=center|Petroleum||194||78.23%||40||16.13%||14||5.65%||154||62.10%||248|-
| align=center|Phillips||1,490||80.76%||274||14.85%||81||4.39%||1,216||65.91%||1,845|-
| align=center|Pondera||1,513||72.22%||516||24.63%||66||3.15%||997||47.59%||2,095|-
| align=center|Powder River||708||80.18%||139||15.74%||36||4.08%||569||64.44%||883|-
| align=center|Powell||1,513||68.90%||538||24.50%||145||6.60%||975||44.40%||2,196|-
| align=center|Prairie||434||71.93%||138||22.89%||31||5.14%||296||49.09%||603|-
| align=center|Ravalli||11,506||65.07%||4,887||27.64%||1,290||7.30%||6,619||37.43%||17,683|-
| align=center|Richland||2,767||74.52%||791||21.30%||155||4.17%||1,976||53.22%||3,713|-
| align=center|Roosevelt||1,559||54.30%||1,211||42.18%||101||3.52%||338||11.77%||2,871|-
| align=center|Rosebud||1,507||56.76%||990||37.29%||158||5.95%||517||19.47%||2,655|-
| align=center|Sanders||3,386||65.99%||1,324||25.80%||421||8.21%||2,062||40.19%||5,131|-
| align=center|Sheridan||1,052||63.72%||523||31.68%||76||4.60%||529||32.04%||1,651|-
| align=center|Silver Bow||5,133||43.71%||6,044||51.47%||586||4.99%||911||7.76%||11,743|-
| align=center|Stillwater||2,549||68.01%||984||26.25%||215||5.74%||1,565||41.76%||3,748|-
| align=center|Sweet Grass||1,250||72.55%||394||22.87%||79||4.59%||856||49.68%||1,723|-
| align=center|Teton||1,932||70.80%||654||23.96%||143||5.24%||1,278||46.83%||2,729|-
| align=center|Toole||1,293||73.97%||366||20.94%||89||5.09%||927||53.03%||1,748|-
| align=center|Treasure||272||70.83%||93||24.22%||19||4.95%||179||46.61%||384|-
| align=center|Valley||2,300||68.23%||944||28.00%||127||3.77%||1,356||40.23%||3,371|-
| align=center|Wheatland||713||71.09%||250||24.93%||40||3.99%||463||46.16%||1,003|-
| align=center|Wibaux||349||72.56%||110||22.87%||22||4.57%||239||49.69%||481|-
| align=center|Yellowstone||29,768||57.82%||18,192||35.34%||3,520||6.84%||11,576||22.49%||51,480'''
|}

See also
Montana elections, 2010

References

External links
Elections at the Montana Secretary of State
U.S. Congress candidates for Montana at Project Vote Smart
Montana U.S. House from OurCampaigns.com
Campaign contributions for U.S. Congressional races in Montana from OpenSecrets
2010 Montana General Election graph of multiple polls from Pollster.comHouse - Montana from the Cook Political Report''

House of Representatives
Montana
2010